The second series of Dancing with the Stars premiered on 7 May 2006. It had an average of 804,000 people watching, more than the first series, and up to a million tuned into the finale. Rebecca Nicholson (who partnered Tim Shadbolt in the first series) was the only dancer to be part of the series, and partnered Shortland Street actor David Wikaira-Paul. One of the most memorable moments in series two was celebrity Rodney Hide and his partner Krystal Stuart, who were awarded only one point from each judge for his cha-cha-cha, but also dropped her during the end of the performance.  On 25 June, Lorraine Downes and her partner Aaron Gilmore took the title of Dancing with the Stars, who ended up winning $111,961.63 for her charity, of the total $333,655, raised for all charities over the series. According to a TVNZ news release, Lorraine Downes won the votes from the public by a slim 0.1%, winning 50.05%, to Faumuina's 49.95%.

Contestants

Scorecard
Red numbers indicate the couples with the lowest score for each week.
Green numbers indicate the couples with the highest score for each week.
 indicates the couples eliminated that week.
 indicates the returning couple that finished in the bottom two.
 indicates the winning couple.
 indicates the runner-up couple.

Dance Chart
 Highest scoring dance
 Lowest scoring dance

Average chart

Week 1 
Individual judges scores in the chart below (given in parentheses) are listed in this order from left to right: Brendan, Alison, Paul, Carol-Ann.

Running order

References

series 2
2006 New Zealand television seasons